The Philippines participated in the Paralympic Games for Persons with Mental Handicap which was held in Madrid. The games followed the 1992 Summer Paralympics in Barcelona, in which the Philippines did not compete in. The Philippines sent a 20-people delegation to the Paralympic Games for Persons with Mental Handicap and its competitors competed at least in athletics and swimming.

Athletics 

The Philippines sent competitors in athletics.

See also
 Philippines at the 1992 Summer Olympics

References

1992 Summer Paralympics
Philippines at the Paralympics
1992 in Philippine sport